This is a complete list of the U.S. states, its federal district and its major territories ordered by total area, land area and water area. The water area includes inland waters, coastal waters, the Great Lakes and territorial waters. Glaciers and intermittent bodies of water are counted as land area. Alaska accounts for 17.53% of the total area; Texas for 7.07%; only 6 states account for 3% or more of the total area and only 17 for more than 2%.

Area by state, federal district or territory

Area by division 
All divisions presented below are as configured by the United States Census Bureau.

Area by region 
All regions presented below are as configured by the United States Census Bureau.

See also 

List of Canadian provinces and territories by area
List of European countries by area
List of political and geographic subdivisions by total area
List of the largest country subdivisions by area
List of U.S. cities by area
List of U.S. states and territories by population

Notes

References 

States by area
States by area
States by area
Area
Lists by area
United States, area